, referred usually to as simply Hakusui-Kōgen Station, is a railway station located in Minamiaso, Kumamoto, Japan. It is an ancient site of a well in the foothills of Japan's largest volcano, Mt. Aso.

The station was originally tied with Chojagahama Shiosai Hamanasu Koenmae Station for the longest train station name in Japan, with 22 hiragana characters each, until both were surpassed by Tōjiin Ritsumeikan University Station in Kyoto in 2020.

Lines 

Minamiaso Railway
Takamori Line

See also 
  List of Japanese Records

Adjacent stations

References

Railway stations in Kumamoto Prefecture
Railway stations in Japan opened in 1992